Orion's head may refer to:

Structures in the constellation Orion:
 Lambda Orionis, binary star
 Collinder 69, star cluster including Lambda Orionis